Flower Hill may refer to:
 Flower Hill, Maryland
 Flower Hill, New York
 Flower Hill, Texas

See also 
 Flower Hill Cemetery (disambiguation)
 Flower Hill Mass Grave